Venta de Ballerías is a locality located in the municipality of Huerto, in Huesca province, Aragon, Spain. As of 2020, it has a population of 11.

Geography 
Venta de Ballerías is located 46km southeast of Huesca.

References

Populated places in the Province of Huesca